Rainy Season is a short horror story by Stephen King, first published in the Spring 1989 issue of Midnight Graffiti magazine, and later included in King's Nightmares & Dreamscapes collection.  It ended a bout of writer's block from which King had been suffering.

Plot summary 
A young husband and wife on summer vacation rent a house in a small town called Willow, Maine, only to be warned repeatedly (if vaguely) to leave by the local inhabitants. They do not comply and, having purchased groceries, return to the house. They learn the price for prosperity the citizens of Willow must pay: every seven years a husband and wife will go there from outside and will stay, despite protests, to become sacrifices during the rainy season. When the "rain" starts, the couple learns the nature of the precipitation: an army of grotesque black toads the size of footballs, armed with needle-sharp teeth and able to chew through doors and walls. After the carnage, the toads melt away into poisonous sludge that is washed away easily. Two residents debate the price that is paid for their prosperity, but decide there is nothing they can do about it.

Film, TV, theatrical, or other adaptations 
"Rainy Season" has been adapted by artist Glenn Chadbourne for the book "The Secretary of Dreams" a collection of comics based on King's short fiction released by Cemetery Dance Publications in December 2006.

The audiobook version of this story was narrated by actress Yeardley Smith. Smith was also in Maximum Overdrive, the 1986 film adaptation of the Stephen King short story "Trucks".

"Rainy Season" has been adapted into a 2017 short film of the same name, written and directed by Vanessa Ionta Wright and produced by Above the Line Artistry. 2019 has been another adaption by Patrick Haischberger, played by Thomas Stipsits, Sabrina Reiter, Inge Maux, Fritz Karl and Wolfgang Hübsch.

Reception 
Wiater et al. compared it to Shirley Jackson's short story "The Lottery", an idea reinforced by the fact that one of the story's characters directly references Jackson's story at one point. Writing at Tor.com, Grady Hendrix called it a "time passer" that was likely expanded from a single surreal image.

See also
 Stephen King short fiction bibliography

References

External links

Short stories by Stephen King
1989 short stories
Horror short stories
Short stories adapted into films